Clinchburg is an unincorporated community in Washington County, in the U.S. state of Virginia.

References

Unincorporated communities in Washington County, Virginia
Unincorporated communities in Virginia